The 1946 Oklahoma A&M Cowboys football team represented Oklahoma Agricultural and Mechanical College (later renamed Oklahoma State University–Stillwater) in the Missouri Valley Conference during the 1946 college football season. In their eighth year under head coach Jim Lookabaugh, the Cowboys compiled a 3–7–1 record (1–1 against conference opponents), tied for third place in the conference, and were outscored by opponents by a combined total of 264 to 202.

The team's statistical leaders included halfback Bob Meinert with 344 rushing yards, Bob Fenimore with 497 passing yards and 38 points scored, and end Neill Armstrong with 479 receiving yards. Armstrong also tied for the lead in the nation with 32 pass receptions in 1946.

Two Oklahoma A&M players received first-team All-Missouri Valley Conference honors in 1946: Bob Fenimore and Neill Armstrong.

The team played its home games at Lewis Field in Stillwater, Oklahoma.

Schedule

After the season

The 1947 NFL Draft was held on December 16, 1946. The following Cowboys were selected.

References

Oklahoma AandM
Oklahoma State Cowboys football seasons
Oklahoma AandM